Márton Váró (born March 15, 1943) is a Hungarian sculptor, recognized for his monumental public art.

Biography 

Márton Váró was born in Székelyudvarhely, Hungary (now Odorheiu Secuiesc, Romania) and attended Ion Andreescu Institute of Arts in Cluj, Romania (1960 to 1966), studying sculpture.  In 1970, he relocated to Debrecen, Hungary, where he soon completed several sculptures for public places.  He was awarded the Munkácsy Prize in 1984.

The recipient of a Fulbright scholarship in 1988, Váró moved to Orange County, California, where he immediately became affiliated with the University of California, Irvine.  His initial years in the US were focused on studying the relationship between architecture and sculpture.  In 1990, he became the Artist in Residence in the City of Brea, California, for a public art project.

Váró currently lives and works in California, spending summers working in Carrara, Italy, where his marble originates.

Works 
Márton Váró primarily uses Carrara marble as the medium for his sculptures; however, he also works with other stones, such as Texas limestone, which was the material of choice for the "Angels" at the Bass Performance Hall in Ft. Worth, Texas.  He is noted for his life-size sculptures, which are figurative in nature.  His sculptures often depict draped female figures, often emerging from the block of stone from which they are carved.  His approach to sculpting is true to classic form, carving directly into the marble or stone, as did the masters like Michelangelo—in fact, Varo's marble comes from the same quarry in Carrara, Italy as did Michelangelo's. The facade of the Ave Maria Oratory church features Váró's 30-foot-tall sculpture of the Annunciation, depicting the Archangel Gabriel greeting the Virgin Mary with the words "Ave Maria" (Hail Mary), with his smaller depiction of Christ the Good Shepherd featured inside.

Awards and scholarships
 1991 Ladanyi Foundation, New York
 1989 Fulbright Scholarship, University of California, Irvine
 1984 Munkacsy Prize

Books
 Watson, Ronald. 1999. "Angels on High: Márton Váró 's Limestone Angels on the Nancy Lee and Perry Bass Performance Hall in Fort Worth, Texas". Texas Christian University Press. ,

References

 Ave Maria Celebrates Unveiling of Annunciation Sculpture
 Unveiling of Annunciation sculpture
 Work on annunciation sculpture resumes at AMU campus
 Work Begins on Annunciation Sculpture for Oratory
 Meet Sculptor Marton Varo
 Bass Performance Hall
 BREA: Civic Center Art Ready to Break Free

External links
 

1943 births
Living people
People from Odorheiu Secuiesc
20th-century Hungarian sculptors
21st-century Hungarian sculptors
Hungarian expatriates in the United States
University of California, Irvine people